Roseberry was a GAA club based in Newbridge in County Kildare, significant in Kildare GAA history, winner of nine county senior football championships. The club evolved to become the Sarsfields club.

Gaelic games clubs in County Kildare